The Young Companion, known as Liángyǒu in Chinese, was a pictorial with captions in both Chinese and  English, published in Shanghai beginning February 1926. Although the direct translation of Liangyou is "Good Companion", the magazine bore the English name The Young Companion on the cover. Called an "iconic magazine" and "a visual shortcut for 'old Shanghai'", the magazine has proven useful in modern times to examine the glamorous side of colonial-era Shanghai. It may have been the most influential large-scale comprehensive pictorial in the 1920s, at least in Asia. It ceased publication in 1945. There were 174 issues in total, which includes the two special issues not given monthly issue numbers, the Sun Yat-sen Memorial Special Issue and the Eighth Anniversary issue. Since 1945, it has been repeatedly reestablished, but the impact has not been the same.

The magazine ran a mixture of content, including photography, art, literature and sports.

History

In 1925 Wu Liande founded the Liangyou Book Company. A year later the Liangyou pictorial magazine was produced, also known as The Young Companion, which was one among "a variety of pictorials" that the Liangyou Book Company produced. Wu Liande acted as the magazine's first editor-in-chief, but was unable to fully administer the post because of his need to attend to the larger business. After the 4th issue, he entrusted the editing to Zhou Shoujuan. Zhou did not stay long and left to study at Qilu University.

In March 1927 Liang Desuo took over editing of The Young Companion as its third editor-in-chief. Within two years, the monthly pictorial sales reached more than 30,000 copies, selling globally. Liang Desuo stayed for six years as the chief editor before leaving The Young Companion in July 1933 being replaced by Ma Guoliang.

In March 1930, it was changed to photogravure printing, and the quality was greatly improved. In August of this year, the 50th edition was increased to 42 pages with 3 pages of multicolored pages.

January to March 1938, he relocated to Hong Kong due to the outbreak of the Anti-Japanese War and fall of Shang in 1937. The magazine was suspended in Hong Kong during bankruptcy of the parent Liangyou Book Company, after a run of 138 issues. The new company that owned the magazine was the Liangyou Fuxing Book Company, who restarted The Young Companion in February 1939 in Shanghai under editor-in-chief Zhang Yuanheng (張沅恒). It ran until December 1941, when the 171st issue was published.

The war interfered with further publishing. Even though the Japanese had taken over the parent company Liangyou Fuxing Book Company, and Chinese owners cooperating reopened the company in April 1942, The Young Companion'''s editor Zhang Yuanheng would not work with them. After the war in October 1945, he published the next and final (172nd) under the name Liangyou Picture Magazine''. The Liangyou Fuxing Book Company was closed after the war "in 1946, due to the guilt of shareholders."

Hong Kong Revival
In 1954 Wu Liande restarted his company in Hong Kong, and "re-released the overseas version of "Liangyou," ceasing publication in 1968. In 1984, Wu Fude, son of Wu Liande restarted the Liangyou Book Company, including the "Liangyou" pictorial. However, the magazine did not become as influential as its previous incarnation in Shanghai.

Gallery

The modern girl's dilemma, being pretty versus being active 
The magazine was known for its cover-girls, beautiful women who appeared to be active, "modern girls in motion." The motion was really performed by the girls inside the magazine playing sports, while the cover-girls presented modern women, attractive to men in their non-traditional western clothes and implied activities.

The women were modern girls, appearing to not be dressed up looking for men, but living their lives and doing what they enjoyed doing. The modern girls of Shanghai appeared in the city's artwork, including magazines such as The Young Companion and Ling Long, but also in the advertisements of the city and calendars. They were shown as actively living their lives, "driving motorcycles, swimming, horse riding, horse racing, rowing competitions, and participating in social assistance." The term modern girl normally applies to Japanese women of the time, but "the image of modern Chinese women became incorporated into that of the 'Modern Girl' in Japan." Guan Zilan, Liangyou-cover-girl for issue 45, who was a Chinese student and artist who went to Japan to study, was labeled modern girl in this fashion.

Modern scholar Maura Elizabeth Cunningham points out that in spite of the idea of the independence of the modern girl circulating in the period, the magazine showed women how women's sports could be used to satisfy the male gaze and give examples of a "model of femininity for female viewers to reproduce." She also pointed out that the magazine showed progress, with pictures inside the magazine not only showing beauty, but also women actively doing sports, something unimaginable a generation earlier.

References

External links

Peter Lau remembers his former mentor, Wu Luen Tak, the founder of The Young Companion pictorial.
Various aspects of the modern girl in Liangyou discussed.
Page with photos and story about Liangyou's photographers on a China-wide photo expedition.
Encyclopedia Baike article

Chinese-language magazines
Defunct magazines published in China
Magazines established in 1926
Magazines disestablished in 1945
Magazines published in Shanghai
Weekly magazines published in China